The women's 57 kg competition of the 2013 World Judo Championships was held on August 28.

Medalists

Results

Pool A

Pool B

Pool C

Pool D

Finals

Repechage

References

External links
 
 Draw

W57
World Judo Championships Women's Lightweight
World W57